Electrokoenenia yaksha is a Palpigrade that lived approximately 100 million years ago during the Cretaceous period. It is the first microwhip scorpion fossil from this period to be found and is currently the oldest known Palpigrade.

The palpigrade was discovered in 2016 when a specimen was found in Cretaceous (Cenomanian) Burmese amber from the Hukawng Valley in northern Myanmar.

References

Palpigradi
Prehistoric arachnid genera
Cenomanian life
Cretaceous animals of Asia
†
Fossils of Myanmar
Burmese amber
Fossil taxa described in 2016
Taxa named by Michael S. Engel